Catherine Mothes-Jobkel (born 7 June 1970 in Bègles) is a former tennis player from France who competed on the WTA Tour from 1987 to 1997. She turned professional in 1989 and reached a career-high ranking of world No. 67, in June 1993. During her career, she competed in the French Open eight times, twice reaching the second round, and in the US Open twice, reaching the second round in 1991. In 1993, she reached the semifinals of the Belgian Open.

ITF finals

Singles: 14 (9–5)

External links
 
 

1970 births
French female tennis players
Sportspeople from Gironde
Living people
People from Bègles